Nemai Ghosh (born 12 December 1939) is an Indian former cricketer. He played eleven first-class matches for Bengal between 1958 and 1966.

See also
 List of Bengal cricketers

References

External links
 

1939 births
Living people
Indian cricketers
Bengal cricketers
People from Mymensingh District